Lookman Adekunle Salami, known professionally as L.A. Salami, is a British singer and songwriter, who is signed to Sunday Best Recordings & Domino Publishing. He has released three EPs and two albums.

Career
Salami grew up in foster care, developing a fascination with music.

Salami's break came in 2012 when chosen to support Lianne La Havas on tour. He was eventually signed by independent London label Camouflage Recordings. Christopher Bailey, Chief Creative Officer at fashion house Burberry, then got in contact to arrange a Burberry Acoustic Session which led to L.A. Salami opening the Burberry Prorsum Menswear Spring/Summer 2014 runway show in Kensington Palace Gardens, Hyde Park.

Salami's first EP, Another Shade of Blue was released through Camouflage Recordings in 2013. They released The Prelude EP in 2014, which was followed by a short tour around Britain
In 2014 Burberry asked L.A. Salami to soundtrack their SS/14 Menswear campaign, Zane Lowe singled him out as a future star of BBC Radio 1, and Esquire Magazine featured him as one of the ten ‘Most Stylish Men In Music’.

In 2015, Salami signed to Sunday Best Recordings & Domino Publishing. He spent the rest of that year working on his debut full-length album, recording with producer Matt Ingram at the Urchin Studios in London.

In August 2016 he released his debut album Dancing With Bad Grammar which featured singles "The City Nowadays", "I Wear This Because Life Is War!", "Going Mad As The Street Bins" and "I Can’t Slow Her Down".

His second album The City of Bootmakers was recorded in Berlin with producer Robbie Moore at his studio Impression Recordings, and released in April 2018 on Sunday Best. It featured the singles "England is Unwell", "Terrorism! (The Isis Crisis)", "Generation L(ost)" and "Jean Is Gone", and was named Album of the Day by BBC 6 Music.

His new EP is called Self-Portrait In Sound EP and was released on 4 February 2020.

On 28 April 2020, he announced the release of his third album, The Cause of Doubt & a Reason to Have Faith. The album is set to release on 17 July 2020. Its first single is called "Things Ain't Changed", and the song and its video were released on 28 April.

Discography

Studio albums 
Dancing With Bad Grammar (Sunday Best, 2016)
The City of Bootmakers (Sunday Best, 2018)
The Cause of Doubt & a Reason to Have Faith (Sunday Best, 2020) 
Ottoline (Sunday Best, October 14, 2022)

EPs 
Another Shade of Blue (Camouflage, 2013)
The Prelude EP (Camouflage, 2014)
Lookman & The Bootmakers (Sunday Best, 2017)
Self Portrait in Sound EP (2020)

Singles 
"Jianni's From Australia (She'll Get By Fine)" (2012)
"The Old Queen's Head" (Camouflage, 2013)
"Another Shade of Blue" (Camouflage, 2013)
"Just Wasting Time (The Otis Redding Way)" (Camouflage, 2014)
"When The Poet Sings" (Camouflage, 2014)
"The City Nowadays" (2016)
"Going Mad As The Street Bins" (2016)
"I Wear This Because Life Is War!" (2016)
"I Can't Slow Her Down" (2017)
"Terrorism! (The Isis Crisis)" (2017)
"Generation L(ost)" (2017)
"Jean Is Gone" (2018)
"Things Ain't Changed" (2020)

References 

Living people
British folk singers
British folk guitarists
Place of birth missing (living people)
Year of birth missing (living people)
British male singer-songwriters
21st-century British singers
Domino Recording Company artists
21st-century British male singers